The 2019 Nigerian Senate election in Plateau State was held on February 23, 2019, to elect members of the Nigerian Senate to represent Plateau State. Ignatius Datong Longjan representing Plateau South and Hezekiah Ayuba Dimka representing Plateau Central all won on the platform of All Progressives Congress while Istifanus Gyang representing Plateau North won on the platform of Peoples Democratic Party.

Overview

Summary

Results

Plateau South 
A total of 12 candidates registered with the Independent National Electoral Commission to contest in the election. APC candidate Ignatius Datong Longjan won the election, defeating PDP candidate, Kefas Peter Dandam and 10 other party candidates. Datong scored 140,918 votes, while  PDP candidate Dansam scored 132,441 votes.

Plateau Central 
A total of 14 candidates registered with the Independent National Electoral Commission to contest in the election. APC candidate Hezekiah Ayuba Dimka won the election, defeating PDP candidate David Shikfu Parradang and 12 other party candidates. Dimka pulled 149,457 votes, while PDP candidate Parradang  scored 145,048 votes.

Plateau North 
A total of 14 candidates registered with the Independent National Electoral Commission to contest in the election. PDP candidate Istifanus Gyang won the election, defeating APC candidate, Rufus Bature and 12 other party candidates. Gyang pulled 269,555 votes to defeat the APC Candidate, Bature who scored 171,233 votes.

References 

Plateau State senatorial elections
Plateau State Senate elections